A sigh is an audible exhalation, usually signifying some emotional experience.  

Sigh may also refer to:

Pianto, a musical representation of a sigh
Sigh (band), a Japanese metal band
 Un Sospiro (English: "A Sigh"), a piano piece by Franz Liszt
Sigh (film), a 2000 Chinese film directed by Feng Xiaogang